The 1967  Mudurnu earthquake or more correctly, the 1967 Mudurnu Valley earthquake occurred at about 18:57 local time on 22 July near Mudurnu, Bolu Province, north-western Turkey. The magnitude 7.4  earthquake (but only 6.0 on the  scale.) was one of a series of major and intermediate quakes that have occurred in modern times along the North Anatolian Fault since 1939.

Earthquake
Although the Mudurnu Valley earthquake was relatively strong, there were only 86 fatalities, with 332 people injured. About 5,200 houses were destroyed or damaged beyond repair; some 900 of these were in Adapazarı at the far western end of the fault zone, and many collapsed completely as a result of aftershocks. The authors of the 1968 Unesco report into the Mudurnu Valley earthquake felt that its Mercalli intensity was difficult to estimate accurately.  In some places an implied level of XII (Extreme) was evident, whereas the vibrational effects were nearer VIII–IX (Severe–Violent). Although a large number of sites were independently assessed by up to six observers, variations of up to four degrees of the Mercalli scale indicated that an accurate figure was practically impossible to gauge.

Damage
Considering the large surface wave magnitude (7.1) and widespread surface rupturing, structural damage to buildings was surprisingly small; variations in damage were related to the materials used and construction method of individual buildings, rather than the proximity to the fault break. Some villages suffered 70% destruction of property, while others nearby with fault lines running right through them had only a few houses damaged.

Surface rupture
The earthquake is named after the river valley, not the town of Mudurnu itself, which is some distance south of the river and outside the rupture zone.

Aftershocks

See also
List of earthquakes in 1967
List of earthquakes in Turkey

References

Sources

.
 
 
 .

External links

1967 Mudurnu
1967 earthquakes
1967 in Turkey
History of Bolu Province
July 1967 events in Europe
1967 disasters in Turkey